is a Japanese animator, director, and storyboard artist.

Early life
Ootani was born in Fukui Prefecture on September 22, 1979. He first became interested in animation while in high school after seeing Hayao Miyazaki's film Princess Mononoke.

Career

Ootani joined studio Imagin as an in-between animator around 2004. He mostly worked as a sub-contracting animator, and eventual episode director, for Madhouse and Imagin. He made his directorial debut with an OVA adaptation of Ayano Yamane's manga A Foreign Love Affair. Ootani's final projects with Imagin were Needless  (2009) and Wolverine (2011), which the studio assisted under Madhouse for, where he was promoted to series assistant director.

After the dissolution of Imagin, former studio producer Yasuhiro Okada joined studio Shaft with Ootani, where the latter mainly did episodic direction and storyboard art. In 2020, he made his series directorial debut as the chief episode director on Assault Lily Bouquet with Shouji Saeki, and the following year debuted as director of Pretty Boy Detective Club under Akiyuki Shinbo. After Pretty Boy Detective Club, he decided that he wanted to try directing at a different studio since he had been working with Shaft for so long; so, in the middle of the production for the series Dance Dance Danseur, produced by MAPPA, he was asked if he wanted to join the series as its "ballet director."

Style
In an interview between him and Shaft colleague Kenjirou Okada, the two were asked to describe each other's styles and processes as directors. Okada stated that Ootani didn't hesitate to put appealing art and animations first and foremost, and that he admired that about Ootani. Akiyuki Shinbo also commented in a separate interview that he felt Ootani shared a very similar sense of visual direction as him. Despite originally being inspired by director Hayao Miyazaki, Ootani has commented that his style is much more eccentric and different from Miyazaki's, which he described was due to trying to survive and stand out in the industry.

Works

Television series
 Highlights roles with series directorial duties. Highlights roles with assistant director or supervising duties.

OVAs
 Highlights roles with series directorial duties.

Video games
 Highlights roles with major directorial duties.

Notes

References

External links
 
 

Living people
Anime directors
1979 births